Lille is a municipality located in the Belgian Antwerp Province. The municipality comprises the towns of Lille, Gierle, and Wechelderzande. In 2021, Lille had a total population of 16,517. The total area is 59.40 km².

The Krawatencross is an annual cyclo-cross race held in Lille every February.

Notable inhabitants
 Frans Van Giel, painter (1892-1975)
 Lords of Poederlée

References

External links

Official website - Available only in Dutch

Lille, Belgium
Municipalities of Antwerp Province
Populated places in Antwerp Province